The 2013 San Jose Earthquakes season is the club's 16th year of existence, as well as its 16th season in Major League Soccer and its sixth consecutive season in the top-flight of American soccer. Including all previous franchises, this is the 31st year with a soccer club in the San Jose area sporting the name "Earthquakes".

San Jose entered the season as the defending Supporters' Shield winners, having the best regular season in 2012.

Background

Review

Club

Current roster
As of September 14, 2013.

Club staff 

 

|}

Other information

Competitions

Preseason

Timbers Tournament

2013 Season

Results by round

Match results

U.S. Open Cup

CONCACAF Champions League

Group stage

International Friendlies

Standings

Western Conference

Major League Soccer

Statistics

Transfers

In

MLS Drafts 

(*) Unsigned

Winter Transfer Window

Summer Transfer Window

Loans

Out

References 

San Jose Earthquakes seasons
San Jose Earthquakes
San Jose Earthquakes
San Jose Earthquakes